Salina Prakash is an actress from Chandigarh, India.

Television

References 

Year of birth missing (living people)
Living people
Indian television actresses
21st-century Indian actresses
Actresses from Chandigarh